Yalinga Airport  is a rural airstrip  northeast of Yalinga, a town in the Haute-Kotto prefecture of the Central African Republic.

See also

Transport in the Central African Republic
List of airports in the Central African Republic

References

External links 
OpenStreetMap - Yalinga
OurAirports - Yalinga Airport

Airports in the Central African Republic
Buildings and structures in Haute-Kotto